Temporary work or temporary employment (also called gigs) refers to an employment situation where the working arrangement is limited to a certain period of time based on the needs of the employing organization. Temporary employees are sometimes called "contractual", "seasonal", "interim", "casual staff", "outsourcing",  "freelance"; or the words may be shortened to "temps". In some instances, temporary, highly skilled professionals (particularly in the white-collar worker fields, such as human resources, research and development, engineering, and accounting) refer to themselves as consultants. Increasingly, executive-level positions (e.g. CEO, CIO, CFO, CMO, CSO) are also filled with Interim Executives or Fractional Executives.

Temporary work is different from secondment, which is the assignment of a member of one organisation to another organisation for a temporary period, and where the employee typically retains their salary and other employment rights from their primary organisation but they work closely within the other organisation to provide training and the sharing of experience.

Temporary workers may work full-time or part-time depending on the individual situation. In some instances, temporary workers receive benefits (such as health insurance), but usually benefits are only given to permanent employees as a cost-cutting measure by the employer to save money. Not all temporary employees find jobs through a temporary employment agency. With the rise of the Internet and gig economy (a labor market characterized by the prevalence of short-term contracts or freelance work as opposed to permanent jobs), many workers are now finding short-term jobs through freelance marketplaces: a situation that brings into being a global market for work.

A temporary work agency, temp agency or temporary staffing firm finds and retains workers. Other companies, in need of short-term workers, contract with the temporary work agency to send temporary workers, or temps, on assignments to work at the other companies. Temporary employees are also used in work that has a cyclical nature, requiring frequent adjustments to staffing levels.

History
[[File:Temp labor stats.png|thumbnail|Trends in temporary work (US): source: D. H. Author, Outsourcing at Will: The Contribution of Dismissal Doctrine to the Growth of Employment Outsourcing]] The staffing industry in the United States began after World War II with small agencies in urban areas employing housewives for part-time work as office workers. Over the years the advantages of having workers who could be hired and laid off on short notice and were exempt from paperwork and regulatory requirements resulted in a gradual but substantial increase in the use of temporary workers, with over 3.5 million temporary workers employed in the United States by 2000.

There has been a paradigm shift since the 1940s in the way firms utilize temporary workers. Throughout the Fordist era, temporary workers made up a rather marginal proportion of the total labor force in North America. Typically, temporary workers were white women in pink collar, clerical positions who provided companies with a stop-gap solution for permanent workers who needed a leave of absence, when on vacation or in illness. In contrast, in the Post-Fordist period, characterized by neoliberalism, deindustrialization and the dismantling of the welfare state, these understandings of temporary labor began to shift. In this paradigm, the idea of the temporary worker as a stopgap solution to permanent labor became an entirely normative employment alternative to permanent work.

Therefore, temporary workers no longer represented a substitute for permanent workers on leave but became semi-permanent, precarious positions routinely subject to the threat of elimination because of fluctuations in a company's products. In the context of today's temporary labor force, both people and positions have become temporary, and temporary agencies use the temporary worker in a systematic and planned, as opposed to impromptu, manner.

Temporary employment has become more prevalent in America due to the rise of the Internet and the gig economy. The "gig economy" is defined as a labor market characterized by the prevalence of short-term contracts or freelance work instead of permanent jobs. It is a common misconception that participation in the gig economy is a relatively new method of employment. But in actuality, finding work in the gig economy is similar to the employment style prior to the Industrial Revolution. It is the "one-person, one-career model" that we are accustomed to, and that the gig economy is disrupting, which is the relatively recent phenomenon. Before the Industrial Revolution in the 19th century, it was common for one person to take on multiple temporary jobs to piece together livable earnings.

Post-Fordism
As the market began to transform from Fordism to a post-Order regime of capital accumulation, the social regulation of labor markets and the very nature of work began to shift. This transformation has been characterized by an economic restructuring that emphasized flexibility within spaces of work, labor markets, employment relationships, wages and benefits. And indeed, global processes of neoliberalism and market rule contributed greatly to this increasing pressure put on local labor markets towards flexibility. This greater flexibility within labor markets is important at the global level, particularly within OECD countries and liberal market economies (see liberal market economy).

The temporary labor industry is worth over €157 billion per year, and the largest agencies are spread across over 60 nations. The biggest temporary work agencies are most profitable in emerging economies of the Global North and those that have undergone market liberalization, deregulation, and (re)regulation.

Temporary work opportunities and restrictions vary around the world. Chile, Columbia and Poland have the highest percentage of temporary dependent employment at 28.7%, 28.3%, and 27.5% respectively. Romania, Lithuania, and Estonia have the lowest percentage of temporary dependent employment that ranges from 1–4%. The United Kingdom has 6% temporary employment, Germany has 13% temporary employment, and France has 16% temporary employment. In many countries, there are no restrictions on the type of temporary work that is legal, including the United Kingdom, Canada, China, Sweden, and Denmark. The United Kingdom has in place the Temporary Agency Work Directive 2008, which ensures equal pay and treatment of temporary workers. Similarly, Brazil enforces full-time employment regulations to part-time employment and outsourcing. In some countries, including Brazil, there is a wage gap between temporary and permanent workers, but this is due to violations of legislation that specify equal wage determination. In other countries, prohibitions are placed on temporary employment in fields such as agriculture, construction, and non-core employment. In Mexico, a temporary employee is, "prohibited to perform the same work as regular employee", making temporary work illegal.

Gig economy-based temporary work is prevalent around the world. Uber, for example, operates in North, Central, and South America, Europe, Middle East, Africa, East, South, and Southeast Asia, Australia, and New Zealand. Airbnb advertises listings in 191 countries around the world with the most in Europe.

The desire to market flexible, adaptable temporary workers has become a driving, monetary oriented objective of the temporary work industry. This has caused individual agencies to adopt practices that focus on competition with other firms, that promote "try before you buy" practices, and that maximize their ability to produce a product: the temporary worker. Through this process, the ideal temporary worker has today become largely imagined, produced, and marketed by temporary agencies.

Agencies
The role of a temp agency is as a third party between client employer and client employee. This third party handles remuneration, work scheduling, complaints, taxes, etc. created by the relationship between a client employer and a client employee. Client firms request the type of job that is to be done and the skills required to do it. Client firms can also terminate an assignment and can file a complaint about the temp. Work schedules are determined by assignment, which is determined by the agency and can last for an indeterminate period of time, extended to any point, and cut short. Because the assignments are temporary, there is little incentive to provide benefits, and the pay is low in situations where there is a lot of labor flexibility. (Nurses are an exception to this since there is currently a shortage). Workers can refuse assignment but risk going through an indeterminate period of downtime since work is based on availability of assignments, which the agency cannot "create", only fill.

Whether the work comes through an independent gig economy source or a temp agency, when a temporary employee agrees to an assignment, they receive instructions pertaining to the job. The agency also provides information on correct work attire, work hours, wages, and whom to report to. If a temporary employee arrives at a job assignment and is asked to perform duties not described when they accepted the job, they may call an agency representative for clarification. If they choose not to continue on the assignment based on these discrepancies, they will most likely lose pay and may undermine chances at other job opportunities. However, some agencies guarantee an employee a certain number of hours pay if, once the temporary employee arrives, there is no work or the work is not as described. Most agencies do not require an employee to continue work if the discrepancies are enough to make it difficult for the employee to actually do the work.

A temporary work agency may have a standard set of tests to judge the competence of the secretarial or clerical skills of an applicant. An applicant is hired based on their scores on these tests and is placed into a database. Companies or individuals looking to hire someone temporarily contact the agency and describe the skill set they are seeking. A temporary employee is then found in the database and is contacted to see if they would be interested in taking the assignment.

It is up to the temporary employee to keep in constant contact with the agency when not currently working on an assignment; by letting the agency know that they are available to work, they are given priority over those who may be in the agency database who have not made it clear that they are ready and willing to take an assignment. A temp agency employee is the exclusive employee of the agency, not of the company in which they are placed (although subject to legal dispute). The temporary employee is bound by the rules and regulations of the temp agency, even if they contrast with those of the company in which they are placed.

 Benefits for client firms 
There are several reasons as to why a firm utilizes temp agencies. They provide employers a way to add more workers for a short-term increase in the workforce. Using temps allows firms to replace a missing regular employee. A temp worker's competency and value can be determined without the inflexibility of hiring a new person and seeing how they work out. Utilizing temp workers can also be a way of not having to pay benefits and the increased salaries of regular employees. A firm can also use temp workers to vary compensation in what would normally be an illegal or impossible manner. The role of temp workers in the work space can also have the effects of coercing regular employees into taking more work for less pay. Additionally, temp workers are less likely to sue over mistreatment, which allows firms to reduce the costs of employment in high-stress, regulated jobs.

 Growth of temporary staffing 
Temp agencies are a growing part of industrial economies. From 1961 to 1971, the number of employees sent out by temporary staffing agencies increased by 16 percent. Temporary staffing industry payrolls increased by 166 percent from 1971 to 1981, and 206 percent from 1981 to 1991, and 278 percent from 1991 to 1999. The temporary staffing sector accounted for 1 out of 12 new jobs in the 90's. In 1996, there was $105 billion worldwide in staffing agency revenues. By 2008, $300 billion was generated, worldwide, in revenues for staffing agencies. The Temporary Staffing Industry accounts for 16% of job growth in the U.S. since the great recession ended, even though it only accounts for 2% of all-farm jobs.
This growth has occurred for a number of reasons. Demand in temporary employment can be primarily attributed to demand by employers and not employees  A large driver of demand was in European labor market. Previously, temporary employment agencies were considered quasi-legal entities. This reputation shied potential client employers away. However, in the latter half of the 20th century, there would be shift predominated by legal protections and closer relationships with primary employers. This combined with the tendency for growth of the TSI in countries where there are strict regulations on dismissal of hired employees but loose regulations on temporary work, growth is much faster compared to industrialized nations without these labor conditions.

 Abuse in the temporary staffing industry 
Staffing agencies are prone to improper behavior just like any other employer. There have been cases of some temp agencies that have created and reinforced an ethnic hierarchy that determines who gets what jobs.

Temps have been told to be a "guest" and not a worker, which can lead to worker exploitation. One ramification is that temps have to deal with sexual harassment and are sometimes encouraged not to report it, and in some rare cases encouraged to make themselves "sexually available".

An additional ramification of temp workers "guest" status is being at the bottom of the workplace hierarchy which is visually identifiable on ID cards, in different colored uniforms, as well as the encouragement of more "provocative dress". Their "guest" status often means temp workers are unable to access on-site workplace accommodations and are not included in meetings despite the length of their time working at the client firm.

This is all compounded by a work system in which temps must file complaints about clients through the temp agencies, which, often enough, disqualifies them not only from another assignment at that firm but also from receiving an assignment from that temporary agency upon review. Since a client firm is harder to replace than a client employee, and there is no disincentive to not giving a complaining employee an assignment, there is an incentive for agencies to find employees who are willing to go along with the conditions of client firms, as opposed to severing ties with firms that routinely violate the law.

Occupational safety and health
Temporary workers are at a high risk of being injured or killed on the job. In the US, 829 fatal injuries (17% of all occupational fatalities) occurred among contract workers in 2015. Studies have also shown a higher burden of non-fatal occupational injuries and illnesses among temporary workers compared to those in standard employment arrangements. There are many possible contributing factors to the high rates of injuries and illnesses among temporary workers. They are often inexperienced and assigned to hazardous jobs and tasks, may be reluctant to object to unsafe working conditions or to advocate for safety measures due to fear of job loss or other repercussions, and they may lack basic knowledge and skills to protect themselves from workplace hazards due to insufficient safety training. According to a joint guidance document released by the Occupational Safety and Health Administration (OSHA) and the National Institute for Occupational Safety and Health (NIOSH), both staffing agencies and host employers (i.e., the clients of staffing agencies) are responsible for providing and maintaining a safe and healthy work environment for temporary workers. Collaborative and interdisciplinary (e.g., epidemiology, occupational psychology, organizational science, economics, law, management, sociology, labor health and safety) research and intervention efforts are needed to protect and promote the occupational safety and health of temporary workers. In 2022, NIOSH and partners released a set of occupational safety and health best practices for host employers of temporary workers. Checklists to foster adoption of the best practices and a slide deck staffing companies can use to educate their host employer clients about the best practices are also included.

Pros and cons

Pros
 Easy hire: Those meeting technical requirements for the type of work are often virtually guaranteed a job without a selection process. In this sense, it could be argued that it would be easier to find work as a temporary worker. Also, in some cases, agencies will hire temporary workers without submission of a résumé or an interview
 Potential for flexible hours which can lead to happier employees
 There is an opportunity to gain experience—companies are all unique, so the temporary worker will be exposed to a plethora of different situations and office procedures
 There are companies that do not hire internally and use these staffing services only. They are a good gateway to get employment with a certain company.
 Try before you buy: temporary staff allowing a business to try a worker as part of their team and to confirm that they are the perfect fit before taking them on board long-term, if needed.
 Temporary work can be extremely lucrative for those in less wealthy countries.
 Temporary work with internet of things-based companies offer a source of supplemental income.
 Temporary work may be a way in which someone who has retired can re-enter the workforce.

Cons
Workers, scholars, union organisers and activists have identified many cons associated with temporary work, and more recently the gig economy. These include:
 Lack of control over working hours and the potential for immediate termination for refusing an assigned schedule.
 Positions often are with high turnover rates. Research suggests that plants choose temporary workers over permanent ones when they expect output to fall, which allows them to avoid costs associated with laying off permanent employees
 Lack of reference, since many employers of experienced job positions do not consider work done for a temporary agency as sufficient on a résumé
 In the United States, the gradual replacement of workers by temporary workers resulted in millions of workers being employed in low-paid temporary jobs.
 In the US, the hourly wage paid to a temporary worker is 75% to 80% of what direct-hire employees are paid. Additionally, they often receive few or no employment benefits, such as health insurance, and seldom become full-time employees from their temporary positions.
 Unlike temporary workers hired through a staffing agency, many people in the gig economy do not report their income to the IRS, resulting in an estimated $214.6 billion in the United States alone of unreported income. This can result in fines or jail time.
 In South Asia and Sub-Saharan Africa, temporary workers often suffer from overworking.
 The temporary workforce can become oversaturated, leading to other issues such as wage deflation.
 When a company hires internationally, there is no legal precedent for using the laws of either the hiring company's country of origin or the temporary worker's country of origin.

Legal issues
Scholars have argued that neoliberal policies have been a prominent component in the erosion of the standard employment relationship. This precarious new model of employment has greatly reduced the worker's ability to negotiate and, in particular, with the introduction of advanced technology (that can easily replace the worker), reduced the temp's bargaining power. Internet of Things-based companies such as Uber and Handy have come into conflict with authorities and workers for circumventing labour and social security obligations. It has been suggested that labour regulations in North America do little in addressing labour market insecurities and the precarious nature of temporary labour. In many cases, legislation has done little to acknowledge or adapt to the growth of non-standard employment in Canada.

California Assembly Bill 5 in 2019 addressed the issue of contract workers including those in the gig economy, and set stricter requirements that must be satisfied for a worker to be classified as a contractor and not an employee, as employees receive more worker protection and benefits than contractors. In 2018, Kentucky (HB 220), Utah, Indiana (HB 1286), Iowa (SF 2257), Tennessee (SB 1967) passed laws specifying certain on-demand gig economy workers as "marketplace contractors" and classifying them as independent contractors.

In the European Union, temporary work is regulated by the Temporary Agency Work Directive and the Member States' laws implementing that directive.

Lawsuits have addressed some of the controversies about the status of temporary workers in the sharing economy. For example, two class-action lawsuits settled in 2016 resulted in changes to Uber's employment policies, including clarification of drivers' rights and the company's disciplinary procedures. Some of these policies include Uber agreeing to issue warnings to drivers before cutting them from the company's service, no longer deactivating drivers who commonly refuse rides, informing customers that tips for drivers are not included in the fare, and allowing drivers to create an association to contest terminations. However, the legal settlement did not establish whether these workers are employees or independent contractors.

See also

 Consulting
 Contingent work
 Contingent workforce
 Day labor
 Division of labour
 Denham v Midland Employers' Mutual Assurance Ltd''
 Employment agency
 Fractional Executive
 Gig worker
 Interim Executive
 Labour hire
 Labour market flexibility
 Outsourcing
 Permatemp
 Recruitment
 Up or out
 Zero-hour contract
 Platform economy

References

Further reading
 
 
 

Employment classifications
Precarious work
 
 

pt:Contrato de trabalho#Contrato a termo certo